Maged Abdallah (born 1 January 1970) is an Egyptian fencer. He competed in the individual foil event at the 1992 Summer Olympics.

References

External links
 

1970 births
Living people
Egyptian male foil fencers
Olympic fencers of Egypt
Fencers at the 1992 Summer Olympics